Oleksandr Olegovich Konopko (born 21 February 1964) is a former Ukrainian professional footballer who played as a defender.

Player career
In 2007 he started his career FC Desna-2 Chernihiv, then in 2010 he moved to FC Chernihiv. With the club in 2012 won the Chernihiv Oblast Football Cup and in 2019 won the Chernihiv Oblast Football Championship. In 2020 was granted to participate to the Ukrainian Second League. On 6 September 2020 he scored his first goal in the season 2020-21 against Rubikon Kyiv In summer 2021 he left the FC Chernihiv after more than ten years in the club of Chernihiv.

Honours
FC Chernihiv
 Chernihiv Oblast Football Championship:  2019
 Chernihiv Oblast Football Cup: 2012

References

External links
 Profile at FC Chernihiv 
 
 
 

1990 births
Living people
Footballers from Chernihiv
Soviet footballers
Ukrainian footballers
Association football defenders
SDYuShOR Desna players
FC Chernihiv players
FC Desna-2 Chernihiv players
Ukrainian Second League players